Pierce & Bickford was an American architectural firm active in Elmira, New York from 1891 to 1932. It was formed as the partnership of architects of Joseph H. Pierce (1855-1932) and Hiram H. Bickford (1864-1929), with later partner Robert T. Bickford (1894-1988).

Partners and history
Joseph Hart Pierce was born September 2, 1855 in Dundee, New York to Herschel W. Pierce, a carpenter and builder, and Mariette (Pierce) Pierce. He attended the Dundee schools and the Starkey Seminary of Lakemont, New York, from which he graduated in 1878. After a period as a carpenter, in 1880 he moved to Elmira where he joined the office of architect Warren H. Hayes as a drafter. In 1881 Hayes relocated to Minneapolis, and Pierce purchased his Elmira practice. In 1884 he formed the firm of Pierce & Dockstader with Otis Dockstader as his partner. This was dissolved in 1890 over an ethics dispute between the partners. After an additional year of private practice, Pierce then formed the firm of Pierce & Bickford with Hiram H. Bickford.

Hiram Hooker Bickford was born November 22, 1864 in Barre, Vermont to Daniel G. Bickford, also a carpenter and builder, and Cloe Marie (Hooker) Bickford. He was educated in the Barre Academy in Vermont before joining the office of Fitchburg, Massachusetts architect Henry M. Francis as a student drafter. In 1887 he moved to Elmira and was hired as a drafter by Pierce & Dockstader, becoming Pierce's partner in 1891. In 1920 the partnership was expanded to include Bickford's son, Robert T. Bickford, as junior partner. The three became equal partners in 1925. The elder Bickford died November 8, 1929, with Pierce and the younger Bickford continuing in partnership. Pierce retired from the partnership effective January 1, 1932 and died August 28. Robert T. Bickford practiced architecture under his own name into the 1970s, and died in 1988.

Pierce joined the American Institute of Architects in 1889, followed by Bickford in 1893. Both served terms as president of the Central New York chapter.

Legacy
A number of their works are listed on the United States National Register of Historic Places.

Pierce and Bickford were among the co-founders of the Chemung County Historical Society.

Architectural works

Works by J. H. Pierce, 1881-1884 and 1890-1891
 House, 456 W Water St, Elmira, New York (1883)
 Building No. 3 of F. M. Howell and Company, 79 Pennsylvania Ave, Elmira, New York (1890, NRHP 1984)
 Waverly Village Hall, 358 Broad St, Waverly, New York (1891-92, NRHP 2003)

Works by Pierce & Dockstader, 1884-1890
 30th Separate Company Armory, 307 E Church St, Elmira, New York (1886-88, demolished 2010)
 House for J. H. Pierce, 308 W Clinton St, Elmira, New York (1887)
 First Baptist Church of Watkins Glen, 213 5th St, Watkins Glen, New York (1888, NRHP 2001)
 Jesse Robinson house, 141 Main St. Wellsboro, Pennsylvania (1888, NRHP 1991)
 First Congregational Church, 12445 NY-38, Berkshire, New York (1889, NRHP 1984)
 Parkhurst Memorial Presbyterian Church, 302 W Main St, Elkland, Pennsylvania (1889-90, NRHP 2012)
 House, 413 W Water St, Elmira, New York (1890)

Works by Pierce & Bickford, 1891-1932
 Horseheads Union School, Grand Central Ave and Fletcher St, Horseheads, New York (1891-92, demolished 1988)
 Clifton Springs Sanitarium, 9 and 11 E Main St Clifton Springs, New York (1892-93 and 1895-96, NRHP 1979)
 Justus H. Harris house, 361 Maple Ave, Elmira, New York (1892)
 Prouty Building, 20-24 Seneca St, Geneva, New York (1892)
 St. Patrick's R. C. School, 517 Park Pl. Elmira, NY (1892-94)
 Bigelow Block, 17 Main St, Dundee, New York (1894)
 Elmira City Hall, 317 E Church St, Elmira, New York (1894-95)
 Harpending Block, 11-15 Main St, Dundee, New York (1894)
 House, 619-621 W Water St, Elmira, New York (1894)
 Smith's Opera House, 82 Seneca St, Geneva, New York (1894, NRHP 1979)
 YMCA Building, Geneva, New York (1894)
 Steele Memorial Library, Lake and E Market Sts, Elmira, New York (1895, demolished)
 Elmira Heights Village Hall, 268 E 14th St, Elmira Heights, New York (1896, NRHP 1982)
 House, 530 W Water St, Elmira, New York (1896)
 T. DeWitt Beekman house, 39 Main St, Dundee, New York (1897)
 Corning City Club (former), 149 Pine St, Corning, New York (1897, NRHP 1995)
 Fire Station No. 4, 301 Maxwell Pl, Elmira, New York (1897, NRHP 1988)
 House, 378 W Church St, Elmira, New York (1898)
 Brownlow Building, 406 E Church St, Elmira, New York (1899)
 Dundee Methodist Church, 33 Water St, Dundee, New York (1899-1902, NRHP 2005)
 Hedding Methodist Church (former), 330 W Church St, Elmira, New York (1901)
 Presbyterian Church of McGraw, 3 W Main St, McGraw, New York (1901, NRHP 2002)
 A. F. Chapman house turret addition, 115 S Monroe St, Watkins Glen, New York (1902, NRHP 1997)
 Chemung Canal Bank Building alterations, 415 E Water St, Elmira, New York (1903, NRHP 1978)
 Chapel (former), Woodlawn Cemetery, Elmira, New York (1905)
 Century Club (former), 214 E Church St, Elmira, New York (1906-07)
 House, 421 W Church St, Elmira, New York (1906)
 Steuben County Courthouse (format), 12 Allen St, Hornell, New York (1907-08)
 Sayre Borough Hall, 110 W Packer Ave, Sayre, Pennsylvania (1908)
 Trinity Episcopal Church parsonage, 701 S Main St, Athens, Pennsylvania (1910)
 Arnot Art Museum conversion, 235 Lake St, Elmira, New York (1911-12)
 Carnegie Hall, Elmira College, Elmira, New York (1911)
 House, 354 W Water St, Elmira, New York (1912)
 Elmira Free Academy (former), 610 Lake St, Elmira, New York (1913)
 Masonic Lodge and Opera House (former), 22 Water St, Dundee, New York (1913)
 First Baptist Church of Painted Post remodeling, 130 W Water St, Painted Post, New York (1915, NRHP 1999)
 Fassett Commons, Elmira College, Elmira, New York (1917)
 Erwin Town Hall (former), 117 W Water St, Painted Post, New York (1921)
 Iszard's Department Store, 150 N Main St, Elmira, New York (1924)
 Southside High School, 777 S Main St, Elmira, New York (1924)
 YMCA Building (former), 201 E Church St, Elmira, New York (1924)
 Hamilton Hall, Elmira College, Elmira, New York (1926)
 Tompkins Hall, Elmira College, Elmira, New York (1927)
 Gordon Coy Building, 100 N Main St, Elmira, New York (1929-31)

Gallery of architectural works

Further reading
 Modern Buildings (Elmira: Pierce & Dockstader, 1890)
 Roger G. Reed, Architects of Standing, Pierce & Bickford, Elmira, N.Y. 1890-1932 (Elmira: Chemung County Historical Society, 1983)

Notes

References

Architecture firms based in New York (state)